William Sea (born 3 March 1992) is a French professional footballer who plays as a forward for US Granville.

He is the half-brother of former professional footballer Cyril Yapi.

Club career
After making his debut in the French lower divisions, Sea joined Brest in December 2013 and made his full professional debut a few weeks later, in a 1–0 Ligue 2 victory over Auxerre. He was loaned out to Amiens for the second part of the 2015–16 season, before joining US Concarneau in the summer of 2016. In February 2018 he gained attention for scoring with a bicycle kick from the edge of the penalty area, playing for L'Entente SSG in a match against Lyon Duchère AS.

References

External links
 
 
 William Sea foot-national.com Profile

1992 births
Living people
Association football forwards
French footballers
Ligue 2 players
Championnat National players
Championnat National 2 players
Championnat National 3 players
Stade Brestois 29 players
USC Corte players
Amiens SC players
US Concarneau players
Tours FC players
US Granville players